Captive import is a marketing term and a strategy for a vehicle that is foreign-built and sold under the name of an importer or by a domestic automaker through its own dealer distribution system.

The foreign vehicle may be produced by a subsidiary of the same company, be a joint venture with another firm, or acquired under license from a completely separate entity. The brand name used may be that of the domestic company, the foreign builder, or an unrelated marque entirely (this is one type of "badge engineering").

Background
Captive import arrangements are usually made to increase the competitiveness of the domestic brand by filling a perceived target market not currently served by its model lineup, that is either not practical or not economically feasible to fill from domestic production or a mutually beneficial agreement that helps automakers without a strong distribution network or a presence in a certain country to benefit from the distribution network and stronger brand image of an established automobile manufacturer in that location. One example is the agreement between Chrysler and Mitsubishi Motors that started in 1971, where Chrysler imported Mitsubishi-manufactured vehicles into the United States to fill a void in their compact lineup with vehicles such as the Dodge Colt. Mitsubishi would only start selling vehicles under their own name in the United States in 1982.

In countries or regions where a foreign manufacturer might have a fully owned subsidiary that develops and manufactures vehicles or a strong manufacturing presence, a captive import can be a vehicle from the manufacturers' indigenous country or an affiliated manufacturer worldwide. Holden is the Australian subsidiary of American General Motors, and was considered to be a domestic manufacturer in Australia until Australian domestic production completely ended in 2017. In the past, Holden has also imported the Mexican-built Holden Suburban, a variant of the North American Chevrolet Suburban, along with the Holden Jackaroo built by General Motors' Japanese affiliate Isuzu in Japan. An example of an Australian captive import is the Holden Barina that has since 1985 been the Suzuki Cultus, two generations of the European Opel Corsa, and is currently the Korean Daewoo Kalos (marketed internationally as the Chevrolet Aveo.)

For countries that do not have native manufacturers or a development/manufacturing presence, a captive import is a vehicle not manufactured by the specific company that imported the vehicle but sold under its brand. Usually, the manufacturer of the vehicle might be an affiliate of the importer. The Chevrolet Forester was sold in India by General Motors, where its manufacturer, Japan-based Subaru does not have a sales presence and the importation agreement started during the period when the manufacturer of Subaru, Fuji Heavy Industries, was affiliated with General Motors.

A vehicle manufactured in a country where the manufacturers' indigenous country has a free-trade agreement with other countries in the same region such as the European Union for Europe, NAFTA for North America or ASEAN for Southeast Asia and manufactured in a plant fully or partially owned by that company should not be considered a captive import. The Ford Crown Victoria, which was known for livery use in the United States, particularly for taxi and police duty, was exclusively built in Southwold, Ontario, Canada, at St. Thomas Assembly from 1992 to 2011. It is not considered a captive import in the U.S. because of free trade between the two countries, originally under the Canada–United States Automotive Products Agreement and now under NAFTA.

American market 
In the American market, captive imports "blurred national distinctions" because they have been designed and built elsewhere, but wear a domestic nameplate. The chief reason domestic automakers market captive imports is because "it is cheaper to import those cars than to produce them" in the United States.

The Nash-Healey two-seat sports car was produced for the U.S. market between 1951 and 1954. It combined a Nash Ambassador drivetrain with a European chassis and body and was a product of a partnership between Nash-Kelvinator Corporation and British automaker Donald Healey. After the first model year, the Nash-Healey was restyled and assembled by Pinin Farina in Italy.

The Nash Metropolitan, sold in the U.S. from 1954 to 1962, a captive import for Nash Motors (who designed it themselves, unlike most captive imports built by another company) produced by Austin in the UK specifically for sale in the U.S. By entering into a manufacturing arrangement, Nash would avoid the expense associated with tooling, body panels, and components. When this two-seater sub-compact car was launched, it was the first time an American-designed car had been only built in Europe, having never been built in the United States. Unlike typical European cars of the era, its look was "American" and it had a design resemblance to the large or "senior" U.S.-built Nashes. It became one of the few small cars to sell well during the most bulk-obsessed period of U.S. automotive history.

When Mercedes-Benz was seeking entry into the American market in the 1950s, the company signed a marketing agreement with Studebaker–Packard and became a captive brand in their showrooms. Around the same time, Pontiac dealers briefly sold Vauxhalls.

Ford, who had invented the modern captive-import system in 1948 with the British Anglia and Prefect, added its own European Ford Cortina to its North American dealer network until low demand led to its discontinuation in 1970 when the company introduced its domestic Pinto replacement, and its European market Ford Capri to its U.S. Mercury line in the 1970s and saw strong sales. Ford returned to importing the Mk1 Fiesta in 1978 when the company developed the North American market Escort/Lynx twins until 2013 when the One Ford policy was in full swing where the European market Mondeo and Fiesta are now manufactured in both North America and Europe.

During the same period, Dodge marketed several small Mitsubishi models, mostly sold as Dodge Colts (versions of which would later also be sold under the Plymouth and Eagle brands as well). Chrysler Corporation did not develop its in-house subcompacts during the late 1960s (which GM and Ford Motor Company had done with the Vega and Pinto) where they partnered with an overseas manufacturer with Mitsubishi and Hillman.

The "Plymouth Cricket" (a rebadged Hillman Avenger) and Ford's entire Merkur line were introduced to the U.S. market, but were not as successful.

Other experiments, such as GM's sale of Opel models like the Kadett through Buick dealers in the late 1960s and early 1970s, yielded ambivalent results; the Opels were generally well-regarded and sales were decent but never substantial. In the 1970s, when Buick decided to phase out its Opels and sell small Isuzus instead, the result was a handful of cars carrying a global brand, Buick Opel by Isuzu. Buick was not the first to rebadge Isuzus — Chevrolet did the same with their LUV pickup truck in 1972.

In the late 1980s, GM consolidated its various captive imports of the time (the Daewoo-built Pontiac LeMans notwithstanding) under the Geo brand, which was exclusively handled by Chevrolet dealers.  The cars, built variously by Toyota (the Prizm), Isuzu (Spectrum, Storm) and Suzuki (Metro, Tracker) were generally well received, but the company decided to fold the line back into Chevrolet in 1998.

In 2004, GM began marketing the Chevrolet Aveo subcompact, a rebadged Daewoo Kalos (now a rebadged Daewoo Gentra) assembled in South Korea.  In 2008, GM started marketing the Saturn Astra, which is a rebadged Opel Astra, assembled in Belgium.  And, prior to the brand's phaseout, Pontiac also returned to the captive idea by selling Holden vehicles, first the Holden Monaro as the Pontiac GTO and then the Holden VE Commodore as the Pontiac G8. Pontiac dealers also briefly received a version of the Kalos/Gentra/Aveo, which was sold in Canada as the G3 Wave and in the U.S. as the G3.

In 2011, GM once again used a Holden model, the WM/WN Caprice, as a captive import for its Caprice PPV, but designed for law enforcement agencies in the United States and Canada.

In 2013, GM used the Holden VF Commodore as the Chevrolet SS performance sedan for the 2014 model year.

Other markets 
In Europe, there have been relatively few cases of captive imports, and most have been unsuccessful. The Chevrolet Venture minivan was sold as the Opel/Vauxhall Sintra (SWB) and Chevrolet Trans Sport (LWB) in the late-1990s, but was not only not to European tastes, but also gained a bad reputation due to poor results in safety tests. The practice has been revived by PSA Peugeot Citroën with the Peugeot 4007, Peugeot 4008, Citroën C-Crosser, and Citroën C4 Aircross, which are rebadged versions of the Mitsubishi Outlander and Mitsubishi ASX, respectively. However, the introduction of the Ford Mustang to Europe in 2015 has been successful, owing to the Mustang's image and unique positioning.

In Brazil, the Australian-built Holden Commodore has been sold since 1998 as Chevrolet Omega, replacing the locally built car bearing the same name. Despite being well received by the press and public, sales are much worse than its locally built counterpart, simply because of its high price. However, it is used very often as official government cars. Chevrolet also rebranded the Argentine-built Suzuki Vitara as the Chevrolet Tracker after Suzuki stopped selling cars in Brazil, but it never achieved the same selling numbers from the original car.

In Japan, where foreign car manufacturers have traditionally struggled to compete in the local market, even rebadging of U.S. models like the Chevrolet Cavalier as a Toyota have failed to improve sales.

In Australia, GM's Holden operation sold the 1975-84 Isuzu Bellett/Gemini, itself a license built version of the then current Opel Kadett, as the Holden Gemini. The name was originally Holden-Isuzu Gemini, but after the initial TX series the Isuzu cobranding was dropped. Perhaps the original idea was to foster the Japanese-ness of the model at a time when that might have been seen by customers as a positive, the Nissan's 610 Bluebird being marketed as the Datsun 180B being a big seller at the time. The Gemini was assembled in Australia at Acacia Ridge in Queensland and Holden was still the highest selling brand. The Chevrolet LUV produced by Isuzu was also sold from 1973 for a couple of years, the only official Chevrolet branded model available in Australia at the time (and since). Ford sold the Taurus in Japan, Australia, New Zealand and Hong Kong in 1996, but stopped in 1999. In 1998, the Chevrolet Suburban, was marketed in Australia and New Zealand as a rebadged Holden Suburban with intentions to launch the full-sized SUV in a region that was used to having small to mid-sized SUVs, and the model was discontinued in 2001.

Reasons for failure 

Captive imports often fail, and a shift in exchange rates can raise prices to uncompetitive levels.

Some models have been criticized for marginal quality, such as the spate of Daewoo models marketed under domestic General Motors marques during the 2000s, or for being a bad match for the local driving environment.

The commitment of domestic sales and service staff to an unfamiliar vehicle has been questioned, particularly if the import is seen as reducing sales of other, more profitable vehicles in the lineup.

Others fail due to no fault of their own; the Sunbeam Tiger, for instance, an early 1960s example of the concept of an American Ford Windsor engine in a British (Sunbeam Alpine) body and chassis, enjoyed substantial success until Sunbeam became a captive import of Chrysler Corporation in North America. Chrysler could not be realistically expected to sell a car with a Ford engine, and Chrysler V8 engines all had the distributor positioned at the rear of the engine, unlike the front-mounted distributor of the Ford V8, making it impossible to fit the Chrysler engine into the Sunbeam engine bay without major and expensive revisions. Thus this niche of the automotive market was left to be filled with legendary success by the Ford engined Shelby Cobra.

There may be a deeper, structural issue at work, however. It could simply be that a domestic buyer is unlikely to want an import, and an import buyer is unlikely to enter a domestic showroom. Also, consumers of a specific domestic brand might feel that a captive import does not have the qualities that they want and expect from vehicles of domestic vehicles manufactured by that brand. A captive thus easily falls between two stools. This is probably why the practice of using a separate brand name, such as Merkur and General Motors' short-lived Geo, has ceased — the foreignness of the car is thus discreetly made less apparent. Another factor concerns servicing where captives often do not share components with their domestic counterparts - this often leads to parts incompatibility and/or backorders.

Another view is that the practice could be seen by the public as simply dishonest, causing complete rejection. Certainly in cases when identical models are available at the same time with only the badges differentiating them such as what happened under the failed Button car plan in Australia during the 1980s.

Exceptions 
Not every vehicle that appears to be a captive import really is. A vehicle which is foreign-designed or badged but assembled in the market where it is sold does not fall into this category. Such vehicles are frequently the result of joint venture or strategic alliance arrangements between automakers.

For example, the Renault Alliance, which was sold through American Motors (AMC) dealers in the 1980s, was actually assembled by AMC as part of the brief tie-up between the two companies. The 1985–1988 Chevrolet Nova and the later Geo Prizm, though it was a Toyota design and shared the Chevrolet showroom with many captives, was built domestically by the GM/Toyota NUMMI joint venture. The Eagle Talon and Plymouth Laser, both sisters to the Mitsubishi Eclipse, were manufactured in the U.S. by Diamond-Star Motors, a Chrysler/ Mitsubishi Motors joint venture. Australia's Holden, although it often shares planning and hardware with the rest of GM's global empire such as Opel and Isuzu, has generally preferred to assemble its versions of such vehicles locally. Rover and Honda have co-produced models for the European market, as have Alfa Romeo and Nissan. None of these would be considered imports. With the complete ceasing of automotive production in Australia by Holden and Ford Australia in 2016, who were both considered indigenous Australian automakers, each manufacturer will be switching to a completely-imported lineup and no vehicle sold by Holden or Ford after the cease of Australian production should be considered a captive import since neither maintains an Australian manufacturing presence.

In the United States, a vehicle that is assembled in Canada or Mexico and is distributed domestically by a Big Three automaker is not considered a captive import. This is due to the integration of manufacturing operations by the Big 3 in these countries due to the hospitable trade environment created by the North American Free Trade Agreement (and before NAFTA, the US-Canada Auto Pact), coupled with the proximity of these nations to the U.S. Also, vehicles made and marketed by European automakers that were eventually acquired by the Big Three automakers, such as Land Rover, Volvo, and Saab, are generally not considered to be captive imports. The Opel vehicles sold in the 1960s and 1970s are exceptions to this rule because they were sold through the Buick distribution channel, while retaining the Opel brand name. Thus, they are captive imports.

Recent models 
Examples of captive imports in the U.S. have included the Cadillac Catera, a rebadged Opel Omega, the Chevrolet Aveo, built by GM Daewoo, and the Chrysler Crossfire — an American design which mostly uses Mercedes-Benz mechanicals but was actually built by Karmann in Germany. The Pontiac GTO, which was built alongside the Australian Holden Monaro, also qualifies. The Saturn Astra is another example. It is a rebadged Opel Astra that is imported from Belgium. The successor for Pontiac's seventh generation Grand Prix, the Pontiac G8, is a modified Holden VE Commodore imported from Australia.

Notable captive imports

United States

Japan

Europe

Oceania

Other markets

See also 
Eagle automobile
Geo (cars)
Merkur
Mercury Capri
Badge engineering
Third-generation Ford Taurus

References

External links 
Nash Metropolitans
Isuzu Geminis, including Buick Opel version
Consumer Guide on Cadillac Catera
Official Chevrolet Aveo site

Automotive industry
Import